Antum Amir Naqvi (born 5 April 1999) is a Zimbabwean cricketer.

Naqvi was born in Brussels, Belgium. He was educated at The Hills Sports High School in Sydney. He is a qualified commercial pilot. He made his first-class debut for Mid West Rhinos in the Logan Cup against Eagles in January 2023. He scored 140 not out batting at number six, and took 4 for 22 in the first innings and another wicket and three catches in the second innings in an innings victory for Rhinos. In his second match a few days later he scored 103 in Mid West Rhinos' only innings, thus becoming the 21st person in the history of first-class cricket to score hundreds in his first two innings.

His younger brother Awad Naqvi plays for Tuskers.

References

External links

1999 births
Living people
Sportspeople from Brussels
Mid West Rhinos cricketers
Zimbabwean cricketers